Chetuk is a rural locality (a settlement) in Pchegatlukayskoye Rural Settlement of Teuchezhsky District, the Republic of Adygea, Russia. The population was 465 as of 2018. There are 10 streets.

Geography 
Chetuk is located 24 km west of Ponezhukay (the district's administrative centre) by road. Krasnensky is the nearest rural locality.

References 

Rural localities in Teuchezhsky District